Bamidele Victor Aiyewa (born February 4, 1989) is an American football linebacker who is currently a free agent. He played college football at Washington. Aiyewa was signed by the Tampa Bay Buccaneers as an undrafted free agent in 2011. He has also been a member of the Green Bay Packers, San Diego Chargers, FXFL Blacktips, and BC Lions.

Professional career

Tampa Bay Buccaneers
After going undrafted in the 2011 NFL Draft, Aiyewa signed with the Tampa Bay Buccaneers on July 28, 2011. On August 10, 2011, he was released by the Buccaneers.

Green Bay Packers
Aiyewa was signed to the Green Bay Packers' practice squad on October 15, 2013. On November 27, 2013, he was signed from the practice squad to the active roster. Aiyewa was released by the Packers on May 28, 2014. He appeared in five games, totalling four tackles on special teams. Aiyewa saw his first playoff action against the San Francisco 49ers in the NFC Wild Card round, registering a tackle on special teams.

San Diego Chargers
On August 8, 2014, Aiyewa was signed by the San Diego Chargers. He was released by the Chargers on August 30, 2015.

BC Lions
Aiyewa was signed by the BC Lions on May 18, 2016. On June 18, 2016, he was released by the Lions.

Career statistics
Source: NFL.com

References

External links
 
 
 

1989 births
Living people
Players of American football from Houston
American football linebackers
American people of Yoruba descent
Yoruba sportspeople
American sportspeople of Nigerian descent
Canadian football linebackers
Washington Huskies football players
Tampa Bay Buccaneers players
Green Bay Packers players
San Diego Chargers players
Blacktips (FXFL) players
BC Lions players